"Shor Macha" (Urdu: شور مچا, literal English translation: "make noise") is a song by the Pakistani rock band Entity Paradigm. It is the overall seventh single release by the band, and also being the first single since their comeback in 2009. On August 13, 2010, Entity Paradigm released "Shor Macha" as the first single from their upcoming second studio album, the music video of the song was a dedication to all Pakistanis. The music video of the song was sponsored by djuice and directed by Bilal Lashari.

On December 26, in an online poll by Dawn News the band's video for their single, "Shor Macha", was voted as the second best music video of 2010.

Background
On March 12, 2009, Entity Paradigm announced its official return by performing for first time in over four years. The performance was held at LUMS and was attended by an enthusiastic audience. Without Xulfi and Sajjad A. Khan, the current formation of the band includes Fawad Khan on rhythm guitar and vocals, and Ahmed Ali Butt on keyboards and vocals, Hassan Khalid on bass, Salman Albert on lead guitars, and Waqar Khan on drums. Unfortunately, the reunion did not make big news in the press and media.

Shortly after their reunion they went on performing in Karachi at Ramada Hotel on May 1, 2009 where the band debut their new song "Shor Macha". They also announced that their second album will be released in December, 2010.

In February 2010, news broke about Entity Paradigm taking part in the Coke Studio third season and were found jamming with Arif Lohar at Coke Studio in Karachi. It was also reported that they are going to perform a song together. On February 20, 2010, the band announced that they will be shooting the video of their new single "Shor Macha" and through Facebook invited fans to take part in the shooting of the music video. On March 23, Pakistan Day, exactly one year after their reunion there, the band performed at LUMS where they also performed "Shor Macha". Entity Paradigm also uploaded a sample of their song on their official Facebook page. On August 12, a day before the release of the single Entity Paradigm altered their status to “Kuch Shor Macha Awaz Utha, Jo Josh Dikha Wo Bepanah, Ab Soch Badal K Kuch Kar Dikha, Jo Ban Jaye Azaad Khiyal, Har Azam Tera Kar De Dhamal, Har Amal Tera Wo Bemisal, Kuch Shor Macha Awaz Utha, Coming Soon” on their official fan page on Facebook, announcing their new arrival officially.

Music video
The main concept and theme of the video is very eye catching and activating. The plot of the video wheels around highlighting the current problems and dilemmas confronted by Pakistan and later in the video the focus deflects on the past glorious accomplishments. Through the lyrics the message about a safer and stable future is given towards the end. The video unfolds with the images from deserted streets of the inner Lahore and disappointed faces of the children and young men. The starting part is very captivating and unique in its own way. The nation is being asked to get up from the deep slumber, voice their feelings, show some enthusiasm, change their thoughts and do something on their own. Meanwhile, all the band members are seen during the starting phase. The video initially shows EP performing in a digitally created stadium concert; which again is a message of hope, that someday somehow Pakistan would likely have huge gatherings like this without any alarms.

The video is shot on various locations from Pakistan; Mazar-e-Quaid, Minar-e-Pakistan, Badshahi Masjid, Kallar Kahar, Bahawalpur Fort, Cholistan Desert and interior Lahore, to name a few. The video emphasizes on present issues in Pakistan such as; terrorism, flood and illiteracy, followed by the phrases “Mera hai yakeen mera hai, Imaan mere hatho mai, Ho kiya ye sara jahan” which again is a message of trust and happiness to people out there who have abandoned all the hopes. Towards the end, Ahmed Ali Butt rap in Urdu which is shot from Minar-e-Pakistan’s top. It is coupled with some clips from Pakistan Resolution Day as well. Then the National Anthem is being synchronized with the song along with the sequences of our National achievements such as; images from the army side, missile launches, Abdus Salaam receiving Nobel Prize, Jansher Khan, celebrations after winning World Cup 1992 and 2009, music legends Nazia Hassan, Nusrat Fateh Ali Khan, Noor Jehan and finally sequence of Nishan-e-Haider holders, is shown.

The video of the single "Shor Macha" is directed by one of the most awards winning directors of Pakistan, Bilal Lashari, who has previously come up with sterling music video concepts as well. Wardrobe and styling by Munib Nawaz and make up is given by Mahram Azmat, who are very popular in the Pakistani fashion industry. Moreover, the production of the video is done by Creative Village.

Track listing
Shor Macha

References

External links
 

2010 singles
Pakistani songs
Pakistani patriotic songs
2010 songs